Scott Forbes was an actor.

Scott Forbes may also refer to:

Scott Forbes (footballer)
Scott Forbes (baseball), American baseball coach and player
Scott Forbes (basketball), played for Bahamas national basketball team
Scott Forbes, founder of Studio One (nightclub)